Thomas Richard Mechler (born November 1956), is an American engineer and entrepreneur as well as volunteer political organizer who served as the Chairman of the Republican Party of Texas.

Career
At the time of Mechler's election as State Chairman, Governor Greg Abbott said that he expected Mechler to "strengthen the party [and] continue the momentum of our state's Republican victories and preserve the very values that have made Texas the greatest state in the nation to live, work and raise a family."

In 2005, then-Governor Rick Perry appointed Mechler to the board of the Texas Department of Criminal Justice where he served for nine years, the last five as the Board Vice-Chair. Mechler has served as a Volunteer Prison Chaplain since 2002. On June 25, 2021, the Texas Board of Criminal Justice voted to rename the Tulia Unit in Tulia, Texas the Thomas R. Mechler Unit in Mechler's honor.

Mechler has been a grassroots leader since first becoming involved in Republican Party politics in 1986 in Wasilla, Alaska where he was first elected as a Precinct Chair, followed by his election as the District 16 Vice-Chair and subsequently becoming the District 16 Chair and member of the Alaska Republican State Central Committee. He held these positions until leaving Alaska to attend the Wharton Business School in 1990. He became reinvolved as a Republican grassroots leader when he was elected the Gray County GOP Chair in 1993 (Pampa, Texas), a position he held until he moved to Armstrong County in 2000. He became the County Chair in Claude, Texas in 2001, serving for a year when he was elected to the Texas State Republican Executive Committee ("SREC") where he served from 2002 to 2006. Mechler first became involved in politics because of his strong pro-life beliefs which he continues to hold to this day.

In his statement of resignation as state Republican chairman, Mechler cited time constraints and business and family matters. Having worked in 2016 to unify the Donald Trump and Ted Cruz factions in the Texas GOP, Mechler called for party unity and outreach in his departing statement. A successor for a two-year term was chosen on June 3 at the state Republican Executive Committee meeting in Austin. Candidates who sought the position were Travis County chairman James Dickey, Rick Figueroa of Brenham, and Mark Ramsey, a state committee member from Spring in Harris County.

The 62-member State Republican Executive Committee and the vice chair narrowly chose Dickey to succeed Mechler. Dickey polled thirty-two votes to thirty-one for rival Rick Figueroa.

References

External links

1956 births
Date of birth missing (living people)
Place of birth missing (living people)
Living people
People from Claude, Texas
People from Colfax County, New Mexico
People from Pampa, Texas
Politicians from San Antonio
People from Navarro County, Texas
People from Wasilla, Alaska
Politicians from Amarillo, Texas
Texas Republican state chairmen
Texas Republicans
American energy industry businesspeople
Texas A&M University alumni
Wharton School of the University of Pennsylvania alumni